The 2005 World Weightlifting Championships were held in Doha, Qatar from 9 November to 17 November. The men's 94 kilograms division was staged on 14 and 15 November 2005.

Schedule

Medalists

Records

Results

References
Weightlifting World Championships Seniors Statistics, Page 57 
Results 

2005 World Weightlifting Championships